The star-spotted nightjar (Caprimulgus stellatus) is a species of nightjar in the family Caprimulgidae.
It is found in Ethiopia, Kenya, Somalia, and South Sudan.

References

star-spotted nightjar
Birds of East Africa
star-spotted nightjar
Taxonomy articles created by Polbot